Environmental Protection Agency (EPA) is a legal regulatory entity, working under the supervision of a governing body under the Ministry of Environment and Energy. The Environmental Protection Agency  (EPA) was formed when Environmental Research Center and Maldives Water & Sanitation Authority was merged by the president on December 18, 2008. The EPA Governing Board is a statutory body, established under the Environment Protection Act, with expertise in environment protection, industry, environmental science, regional issues, environmental law and local government.

References

Government of the Maldives